= Gotisch huis (Groningen) =

Coordinates: 53.2165°N 6.5601°E

- Gothic house
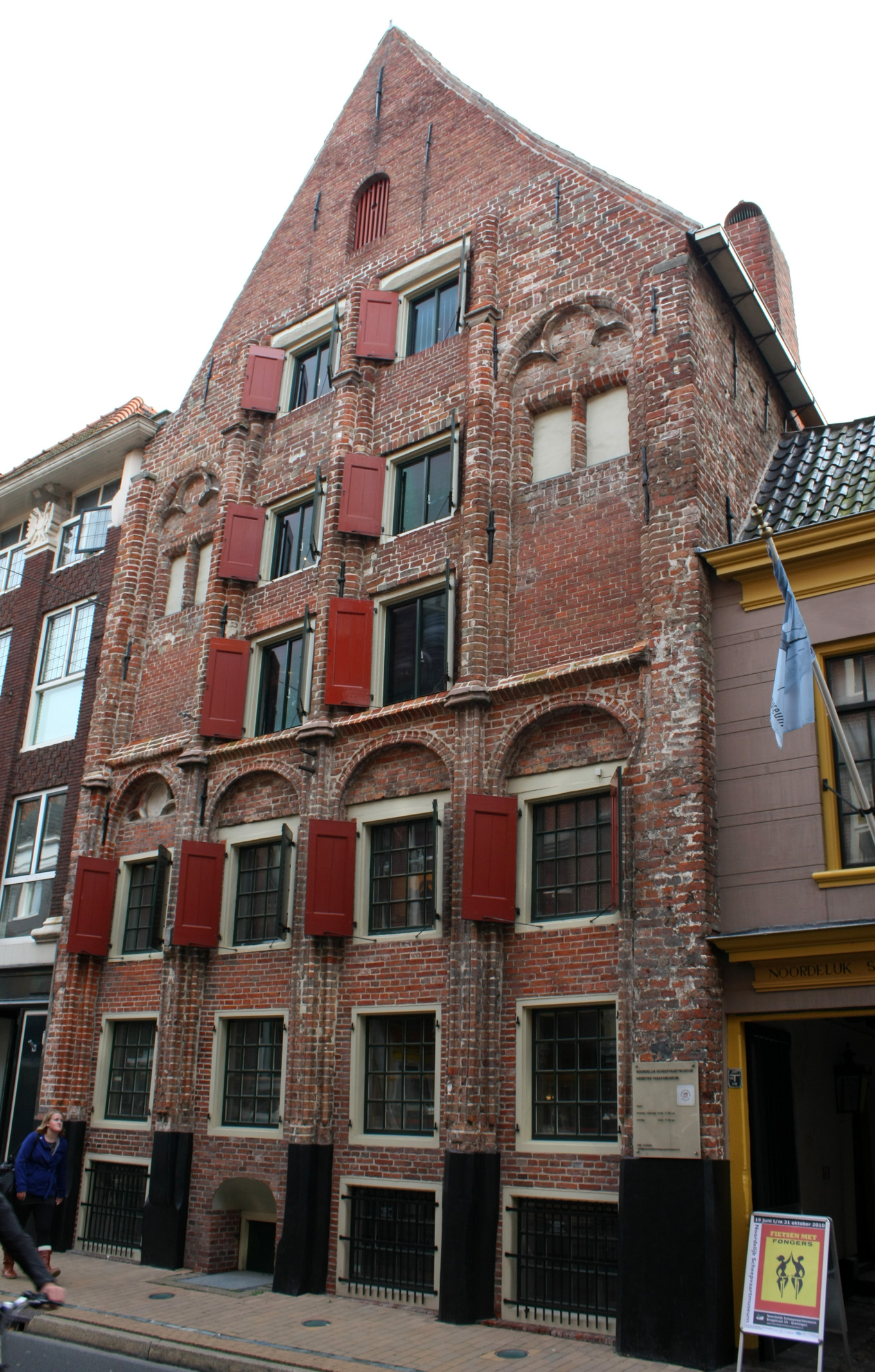
- Gotisch huis in 2010

General information
- Status: Rijksmonument (18433)
- Type: House
- Address: Brugstraat 24
- Town or city: Groningen
- Country: Netherlands
- Completed: 14th century
- Designations: Museum

References
- Groningen municipality

The Gotisch huis (English:Gothic house) is one of the oldest buildings in the city of Groningen, Netherlands. It is a rijksmonument since 1971. Built in the 14th century it is widely seen as the oldest residential building remaining in the city, this fact was mentioned when it became a rijksmonument, even though the Calmershuis that was built in 1250, and mentioned as being a mayor's house, is older. Together with the nextdoor building, the Canterhuis, it is currently in use by the Northern Maritime Museum.
